Saddleback Mountain is a mountain located in Sandy River Plantation, Franklin County, Maine, near the resort town of Rangeley. The mountain is the site of Saddleback ski resort.

Saddleback is flanked to the northeast by Saddleback Horn.

The northwest side of Saddleback drains into Saddleback Lake, then into Redington Stream, the South Branch of the Dead River, the Kennebec River, and into the Gulf of Maine. The southeast side of Saddleback drains into Winship and Conant Streams, then Orbeton Stream, and the Sandy River, another tributary of the Kennebec. The southwest end of Saddleback drains into Cascade Stream, then into Rangeley Lake, Rangeley River, Mooselookmeguntic Lake, Upper and Lower Richardson Lakes, Rapid River, Umbagog Lake, and the Androscoggin River, which drains into Merrymeeting Bay, the estuary of the Kennebec River.

The Appalachian Trail, a  National Scenic Trail from Georgia to Maine, runs along the ridge of Saddleback, crossing the summit. Saddleback Maine, a ski area, is located on the north face of the mountain.

Ranging from beginner trails to advanced and expert trails, the mountain contains 66 ski trails along with 5 ski lifts.

See also
 List of mountains in Maine

References

New England Four-thousand footers
Mountains on the Appalachian Trail
Saddleback Mountain